Robert Alexis "Bob" Nihon (born July 4, 1950 – August 10, 2007) was a Canadian businessman, one of the heirs of the Nihon family fortune and former wrestler. He was Alexis Nihon's son along with his brother Alexis Nihon Jr., and eventually inherited a part of his father's fortune.

Robert Nihon lived in Lyford Cay, Bahamas where he was known to spend time on his yacht.

He also competed at the 1968 Summer Olympics in Mexico City along with his brother Alexis as a freestyle wrestler.

External links
 Sports-Reference

External links
 

1950 births
Canadian emigrants to the Bahamas
Bahamian male sport wrestlers
Sportspeople from Montreal
Canadian people of Walloon descent
Olympic wrestlers of the Bahamas
Wrestlers at the 1968 Summer Olympics
Commonwealth Games competitors for the Bahamas
Wrestlers at the 1970 British Commonwealth Games
Canadian male sport wrestlers
2007 deaths